Orsingen-Nenzingen is a town in the district of Konstanz in Baden-Württemberg in Germany.

Points of interest
 Langenstein Castle with golf course and carnival museum

References

Konstanz (district)
Hegau